This is a list of Dutch television related events from 1998.

Events
8 March - 1996 Soundmixshow winner Edsilia Rombley is selected to represent Netherlands at the 1998 Eurovision Song Contest with her song "Hemel en aarde". She is selected to be the fortieth Dutch Eurovision entry during Nationaal Songfestival held at RAI Congresgebouw in Amsterdam.
17 October - Cherwin Muringen wins the fourteenth series of Soundmixshow, performing as Seal.

Debuts
10 October - Monte Carlo (1998–2002)

Television shows

1950s
NOS Journaal (1956–present)

1970s
Sesamstraat (1976–present)

1980s
Jeugdjournaal (1981–present)
Soundmixshow (1985–2002)
Het Klokhuis (1988–present)

1990s
Goede tijden, slechte tijden (1990–present)
Goudkust (1996–2001)

Ending this year

Births

Deaths